William Gillis may refer to:

Willie Gillis, Norman Rockwell's fictional character
Willie Gillis, a television character in The Rookies
Bill Gillis, Canadian politician
William Gillis (politician), British Member of Parliament for Penistone

See also
William Gillies (disambiguation)